The Latin American Music Awards (Latin AMAs) is an annual American music awards show produced by Dick Clark Productions. It is the Spanish-language counterpart of the American Music Awards (AMAs). As with AMAs, the Latin AMAs are determined by a poll of the public and music buyers and is produced by SOMOS Productions. The first Latin AMAs debuted on October 8, 2015 on Telemundo and was hosted by Lucero. The awards were not held in 2020 as a result of the COVID-19 pandemic, they resumed a year later.

In 2023, the broadcast will be moved from Telemundo to UniMás.

Ceremonies

Categories 

 Artist of the Year
 New Artist of the Year
 Favorite Pop/Rock Female Artist
 Favorite Pop/Rock Male Artist
 Favorite Pop/Rock Band/Duo/Group
 Favorite Pop/Rock New Artist
 Favorite Pop/Rock Album
 Favorite Pop/Rock Song
 Favorite Regional Mexican Artist
 Favorite Regional Mexican New Artist
 Favorite Regional Mexican Band/Duo/Group
 Favorite Regional Mexican Album
 Favorite Regional Mexican Song
 Favorite Urban Artist
 Favorite Urban Album
 Favorite Urban New Artist
 Favorite Urban Artist
 Favorite Urban Band/Duo/Group
 Favorite Tropical Artist
 Favorite Tropical New Artist
 Favorite Tropical Album
 Favorite Tropical Song
 Favorite Collaboration
 Favorite Crossover Artist
 Favorite Crossover Song
Favorite Video
Social Artist of the Year (since 2021)
Favorite Virtual Concert (since 2021)

Special awards 
Dick Clark Achievement Award
2017: Pitbull

International Artist Award of Excellence
2019: Marc Anthony

Extraordinary Evolution Award
2019: Becky G
2022: Christian Nodal

Legend Award
2022: Lupita D’Alessio

Records 
As of the Latin American Music Awards of 2022, Enrique Iglesias is the most awarded artist overall with 13 awards. CNCO is the most awarded group and second overall with 12 awards. Karol G is the most awarded female artist with nine awards, followed by Selena Gomez with six awards.

J Balvin is the most nominated act overall of the award show with 40 nominees, followed by Bad Bunny with 31 and Ozuna with 30 mentions. The most nominated female act are Shakira and Karol G with both 20 nominees. Banda MS is the most nominated group of the show, with 21 nominees, followed by Calibre 50 with 15 mentions.

Most nominations

Most awards

See also
 American Music Award for Favorite Latin Artist

References

External links
 Official account on Facebook
 Official account on Instagram
 Official account on Twitter

Awards established in 2015
Latin music awards
Telemundo original programming
2015 establishments in the United States